Mian Naveed Ali is a Pakistani politician who was a Member of the Provincial Assembly of the Punjab, from May 2013 to May 2018 and from August 2018 to January 2023.

Early life and education
He was born on 14 June 1987 Rahimyar Khan.

He graduated in 2007 from the Islamia University and has the degree of the Bachelor of Arts.

Political career

He was elected to the Provincial Assembly of the Punjab as a candidate of Pakistan Muslim League (Nawaz) (PML-N) from Constituency PP-228 (Pakpattan-II) in 2013 Pakistani general election.

In December 2013, he was appointed as Parliamentary Secretary for labour & human resource.

He was re-elected to Provincial Assembly of the Punjab as a candidate of PML-N from Constituency PP-192 (Pakpattan-II) in 2018 Pakistani general election.

References

Living people
Punjab MPAs 2013–2018
1987 births
Pakistan Muslim League (N) MPAs (Punjab)
Punjab MPAs 2018–2023